Borghamn is a village situated in Vadstena Municipality, Östergötland County, Sweden with 227 inhabitants in 2005.

References 

Populated places in Östergötland County